Tōkai (東海, literally East Sea) in Japanese may refer to:
 Tōkai region, a subregion of Chūbu
 Tōkai, Ibaraki, a village, also known as "Tokaimura" (Tokai-village)
 Tōkai, Aichi, a city
 Tōkai University, a private university in Tokyo
 Tokai High School, private high school in Nagoya
 Tōkai Nuclear Power Plant, Ibaraki
 2478 Tokai, a main belt asteroid
 Tōkai (train), a train service between Tokyo Station and Shizuoka Station
 Tōkai Gakki or Tokai Guitars, a Japanese guitar company
 Kyūshū Q1W Tōkai, an anti-submarine bomber of Imperial Navy
 Tokai Tokyo Financial Holdings, a Japanese financial services company
 Tōkai earthquakes, major earthquakes occurring regularly with an interval of 100 to 150 years
 Tokaimura nuclear accident, a fatal criticality accident in Tōkai, Ibaraki on 30 September 1999

Tokai may refer to:
 Tokai, Cape Town, a large residential suburb of Cape Town, South Africa
 Tokai (character), of Bangladesh, a creation of Rafiqun Nabi
 Tokai (state constituency), a state constituency in Kedah, Malaysia

See also 
 Tōkaidō (disambiguation)
 Tokaj (disambiguation)
 Tokay (disambiguation)
 東海 (disambiguation), the East Asian script for "East Sea"
 Donghae (disambiguation), Korean romanization
 Donghai (disambiguation), Pinyin romanization
 Tunghai (disambiguation), Wade–Giles romanization